Plasticicumulans lactativorans is a polyhydroxybutyrate-accumulating bacterium in the genus Plasticicumulans, which has been isolated from a sewage treatment plant in Kralingseveer, Netherlands.

References

Alteromonadales
Bacteria described in 2014